Asian Politics & Policy is a quarterly peer-reviewed academic journal published by Wiley-Blackwell on behalf of the Policy Studies Organization and the Center for Asian Politics and Policy.  The journal was established in 2009.  The editor-in-chief is Aileen S.P. Baviera (University of the Philippines Diliman). The journal focuses on political science, public policy, and economics in Asia and international relations among Asian countries as well as between Asia and the rest of the world. The journal is abstracted and indexed in Scopus.

References

External links 
 

Wiley-Blackwell academic journals
English-language journals
Publications established in 2009
Political science journals
Quarterly journals